Dolichopodinae is a subfamily of flies in the family Dolichopodidae.

Genera
Allohercostomus Yang, Saigusa & Masunaga, 2001
Katangaia Parent, 1933 (Dolichopodinae or incertae sedis)
†Prohercostomus Grichanov, 1997
Pseudohercostomus Stackelberg, 1931 (Dolichopodinae or incertae sedis)
Tribe Dolichopodini Latreille, 1809
Afrohercostomus Grichanov, 2010
Ahercostomus Yang & Saigusa, 2001
Ahypophyllus Zhang & Yang, 2005
Anasyntormon Dyte, 1975
Dolichopus Latreille, 1796
Ethiromyia Brooks in Brooks & Wheeler, 2005
Gymnopternus Loew, 1857
Hercostomus Loew, 1857
Lichtwardtia Enderlein, 1912 (possible synonym of Dolichopus?)
Neohercostomus Grichanov, 2011
Neohercostomus Grichanov, 2011
Subhercostomus Grichanov, 2011
Ortochile Latreille, 1809
Parahercostomus Yang, Saigusa & Masunaga, 2001
Poecilobothrus Mik, 1878
Setihercostomus Zhang & Yang, 2005
Srilankamyia Naglis, Grootaert & Wei, 2011
Sybistroma Meigen, 1824
Tribe Tachytrechini Negrobov, 1986
Afroparaclius Grichanov, 2006
Afropelastoneurus Grichanov, 2006
Apelastoneurus Grichanov, 2006
Aphalacrosoma Zhang & Yang, 2005
Argyrochlamys Lamb, 1922
Cheiromyia Dyte, 1980
Metaparaclius Becker, 1922
Muscidideicus Becker, 1917
Paraclius Loew, 1864
Pelastoneurus Loew, 1861
Phoomyia Naglis & Grootaert, 2013
Platyopsis Parent, 1929
Pseudargyrochlamys Grichanov, 2006
Pseudoparaclius Grichanov, 2006
Pseudopelastoneurus Grichanov, 2006
Stenopygium Becker, 1922
Tachytrechus Haliday in Walker, 1851

Several extinct genera were also described by Hong in 2002, but all except Leptodolichopodites are considered unavailable names because no type repositories for them were specified:
†Arpactodolichopodites Hong, 2002 (unavailable name)
†A. eocenicus Hong, 2002 (unavailable name)
†Convexivertex Hong, 2002 (unavailable name)
†C. viridulus Hong, 2002 (unavailable name)
†Eoeuryopterites Hong, 2002 (unavailable name)
†E. floricopulatus Hong, 2002 (unavailable name)
†E. fushunensis Hong, 2002 (unavailable name)
†Leptodolichopodites Hong, 2002
†L. longiflagellatus (Hong, 1981)
†Orbicapitis Hong, 2002 (unavailable name)
†O. borealis Hong, 2002 (unavailable name)

References 

 
Dolichopodidae subfamilies